The following is a list of deaths in July 2009.

Entries for each day are listed alphabetically by surname. A typical entry lists information in the following sequence:

 Name, age, country of citizenship at birth, subsequent country of citizenship (if applicable), reason for notability, cause of death (if known), and reference.

July 2009

1
Alexis Argüello, 57, Nicaraguan former triple world champion boxer and politician, mayor of Managua, suspected suicide by gunshot.
Marwa El-Sherbini, 31, Egyptian pharmacist and vilification victim, stabbed.
Karl Malden, 97, American Academy Award-winning actor (A Streetcar Named Desire), natural causes.
Anna Karen Morrow, 94, American actress (Peyton Place), natural causes.
John Henry Moss, 90, American baseball executive (South Atlantic League), mayor of Kings Mountain, North Carolina.
Onni Palaste, 91, Finnish soldier and writer, Winter War veteran, natural causes.
David Pears, 87, British philosopher.
Baltasar Porcel, 72, Spanish Catalan writer, cancer.
Andree Layton Roaf, 68, American jurist, first black woman on Arkansas Supreme Court.
Mollie Sugden, 86, British actress (Are You Being Served?), heart failure.
Rupert Thorneloe, 39, British soldier, Commanding Officer of the 1st Battalion Welsh Guards, improvised explosive device.
Norman Welton, 81, American journalist, photo editor for the Associated Press, colon cancer.
Jean Yoyotte, 81, French Egyptologist.
Lyudmila Zykina, 80, Russian singer, Hero of Socialist Labor, cardiac arrest.

2
Adésio, 76, Brazilian footballer.
Pasquale Borgomeo, 76, Vatican director of Radio Vatican, after long illness.
Steve Brennan, 57, Irish-born American reporter and editor (The Hollywood Reporter), cancer.
Susan Fernandez, 52, Filipina activist and singer, ovarian cancer.
M. K. Chandrashekaran, 72, Indian zoologist, after brief illness.
Kaj Hansen, 68, Danish football player.
Martin Hengel, 82, German theologian.
Herbert G. Klein, 91, American journalist, White House Communications Director for President Richard Nixon.
Tyeb Mehta, 84, Indian painter, heart attack.
David Morley, 86, British paediatrician.
James Oluleye, 79, Nigerian army general and politician.
Robert Daniel Potter, 86, American judge, member of the District Court for the Western District of North Carolina (1981–1994).
Petro Ruçi, 52, Albanian football player (Flamurtari, national team).
Bert Schneider, 71, Austrian Grand Prix motorcycle racer.
Clyde Shugart, 92, American football player (Washington Redskins), stroke.
Robert E. L. Taylor, 96, American publisher and chairman of the Philadelphia Bulletin.

3
Jorge Enrique Adoum, 83, Ecuadorian poet and writer.
Alauddin Al-Azad, 77, Bangladeshi author, natural causes.
John Barry, 84, American president and CEO of WD-40, pulmonary fibrosis.
John Blackburn, 84, American administrator (University of Alabama), myelodysplastic syndrome.
Frank Devine, 77, New Zealand-born Australian newspaper editor, after long illness.
Gabriel Fino Noriega, 42, Honduran journalist, shot.
E. J. Josey, 85, American librarian and civil rights activist, natural causes.
John Keel, 79, American ufologist and writer (The Mothman Prophecies), heart failure.
Barbara Margolis, 79, American prisoners' rights advocate, official greeter for New York City, cancer.
Victor Smorgon, 96, Ukrainian-born Australian industrialist, natural causes.

4
Jim Chapin, 89, American jazz drummer.
Robert E. Hopkins, 94, American optical engineer.
Brenda Joyce, 92, American actress (Tarzan and the Amazons).
Béla Király, 97, Hungarian general and historian, natural causes.
Allen Klein, 77, American businessman, Beatles and Rolling Stones manager, Alzheimer's disease.
Drake Levin, 62, American guitarist (Paul Revere & the Raiders), cancer.
Robert Louis-Dreyfus, 63, French-born Swiss billionaire, leukemia.
Steve McNair, 36, American football player (Tennessee Titans, Baltimore Ravens), shot.
Hugh Millais, 79, British actor and adventurer.
Robert Mitchell, 96, American organist, pneumonia.
Khan Mohammad, 81, Pakistani cricketer, prostate cancer.
Leo Mol, 94, Ukrainian-born Canadian sculptor.
Lasse Strömstedt, 74, Swedish writer.
*Jean-Baptiste Tati Loutard, 70, Congolese politician, Minister of State.
Laurence Villiers, 7th Earl of Clarendon, 76, British aristocrat.

5
John Bachar, 52, American rock climber, fall.
Peter Blaker, Baron Blaker, 86, British diplomat and politician, MP for Blackpool South (1964–1992), pneumonia.
Lou Creekmur, 82, American football player (Detroit Lions) and member of the Pro Football Hall of Fame.
Alfonso de Andrés, 71, Spanish Olympic athlete.
Takeo Doi, 89, Japanese psychoanalyst.
Harry Elliot, 89, British space scientist.
Alfred John Ellory, 89, British flautist.
Oscar Murton, Baron Murton of Lindisfarne, 95, British politician, MP for Poole (1964–1979).
John Orman, 60, American professor and politician, self-appointed chairman of Connecticut for Lieberman party.
Bob Titchenal, 91, American football player and coach.
Waldo Von Erich, 75, Canadian professional wrestler, fall.

6
Vasily Aksyonov, 76, Russian novelist, stroke.
Mihai Baicu, 33, Romanian footballer, heart attack.
Patrick Tracy Burris, 41, American criminal, suspected South Carolina spree killer, shot.
Rene Capo, 48, Cuban-born American Olympic judoka (1988, 1996), lung cancer.
Johnny Collins, 71, British folk singer.
Marlon Green, 80, American pilot.
Oscar G. Mayer, Jr., 95, American business executive (Oscar Mayer).
Robert McNamara, 93, American business executive, Secretary of Defense (1961–1968), natural causes.
Mathieu Montcourt, 24, French tennis player, cardiac arrest.
Jim Reid, 75, British folk musician, after short illness.
Robert L. Short, 76, American theologian (The Gospel According to Peanuts).
Martin Streek, 45, Canadian disc jockey, suspected suicide.
Bleddyn Williams, 86, British rugby player, captain of Wales and British Lions, after long illness.

7
Anabaa, 17, American Thoroughbred racehorse, peritonitis after undergoing surgery from colic.
Mikhail Bachvarov, 73, Bulgarian Olympic sprinter.
Richard Reader Harris, 96, British businessman and politician, MP for Heston and Isleworth (1950–1970).
John Marshall, 77, American sculptor.

8
Harry Gray, 89, American CEO and chairman of United Technologies Corporation.
Bertha Hertogh, 72, Dutch woman whose adoption led to ethnic riots in Singapore in 1950, leukemia.
Robert Isabell, 57, American event planner, heart attack.
Edward Kenna, 90, Australian soldier, recipient of the Victoria Cross.
Judi Ann Mason, 54, American screenwriter, television producer (Good Times) and playwright, aortic dissection.
Waldo McBurney, 106, American beekeeper, oldest worker in the United States.
Nelson Munsey, 61, American football player (Baltimore Colts), heart disease.
Edgar O'Ballance, 90, British military historian.
Lou Pagliaro, 90, American table tennis player, national champion (1940–1942, 1952).
Yury Shlyapin, 77, Russian water polo player, Olympic bronze medalist (1956).

9
William C. Conner, 89, American federal judge (District Court for the Southern District of New York).
Magomed Gadaborshev, Russian Colonel, Head of Ingushetia Forensics and Investigations Center, shot.
George Haig, 2nd Earl Haig, 91, British Army officer, patron of military charities and artist.
Jessie Hollins, 39, American baseball player, drowned.
Ron Kennedy, 56, Canadian ice hockey player and trainer, brain cancer.
Frank Mickens, 63, American educator, natural causes.
Kinuthia Murugu, Kenyan Permanent Secretary, shot.
Henri Verbrugghe, 79, Belgian Olympic canoer.

10
John Caldwell, 71, Irish boxer, Olympic medalist (1956), world bantamweight champion (1961–1962), cancer.
Sir Edward Downes, 85, British conductor, assisted suicide.
Ebba Haslund, 91, Norwegian author.
Jack B. Horner, 87, American politician.
Patrick J. McManus, 54, American politician, Mayor of Lynn, Massachusetts (1992–2001).
Frank Seipelt, 48, German Olympic weightlifter (1984, 1988 and 1992 Olympics).
Edward Durell Stone, Jr., 76, American landscape architect.
Zena Marshall, 83, Kenyan-born British actress (Dr. No), after short illness.

11
Maria del Carmen Bousada de Lara, 69, Spanish woman believed to be world's oldest mother, cancer.
Manuel Carrascalão, 75, East Timorese politician, cerebral embolism.
Robert 'Dolly' Dunn, 68, Australian child molester, multiple organ failure.
Reg Fleming, 73, Canadian hockey player (Chicago Blackhawks).
Arturo Gatti, 37, Canadian boxer, strangulation.
Paul Hemphill, 73, American author, throat cancer.
*Ji Xianlin, 97, Chinese linguist, paleographer, historian and writer, heart attack.
Lawyer Ron, 6, American Thoroughbred racehorse, complications after colic surgery.
Mark Mandala, 72, American television executive, president of ABC (1986–1994), heart attack.
Žan Marolt, 44, Bosnia-Herzegovinian actor.
Geraint Owen, 43, British actor, cerebral haemorrhage.

12
Doris Barr, 87, Canadian baseball player, original member of All-American Girls Professional Baseball League.
Charles N. Brown, 72, American founding editor of Locus magazine.
Vinod Chaubey, 49, Indian police officer, shot in the Rajnandgaon ambush.
Tommy Cummings, 80, British football player (Burnley F.C.).
Donald MacCormick, 70, British television journalist, heart attack.
Shesha Palihakkara, 81, Sri Lankan dancer, actor and producer.
Christopher Prout, Baron Kingsland, 67, British politician and barrister, MEP (1979–1994), pulmonary embolism.
S. G. Sender, 78, Belgian pastry chef, after long illness.
Pavel Smeyan, 52, Russian singer and actor, cancer.
Nikola Stanchev, 78, Bulgarian wrestler, Olympic gold medalist.
Simon Vinkenoog, 80, Dutch poet and writer.
Jane Weinberger, 91, American author, widow of Caspar Weinberger, stroke.

13
Uma Aaltonen, 68, Finnish author, journalist and politician.
Amin al-Hafez, 83, Lebanese politician, Prime Minister (1973).
Giuseppe Alessi, 103, Italian politician, President of Sicily (1947–1949, 1955–1956).
Robert Cushman, 62, American photograph curator (Academy of Motion Picture Arts and Sciences).
Neil Munro, 62, Canadian director, actor and playwright, after long illness.
Nilu Phule, 78, Indian Marathi and Hindi film actor, esophageal cancer.
Vince Powell, 80, British scriptwriter (Love Thy Neighbour, Mind Your Language).
Beverly Roberts, 96, American actress, natural causes.
Don Schneider, 86, American football player.
Dash Snow, 27, American artist, heroin overdose.

14
Pat Brady, 83, American football player (Pittsburgh Steelers), lymphoma.
Lucio Ceccarini, 78, Italian water polo player.
Sam Church, 72, American labor leader (UMWA), complications of surgery.
Joe DiGangi, 94, American bullpen catcher (New York Yankees), natural causes.
John Fautenberry, 46, American serial killer, execution by lethal injection.
Phyllis Gotlieb, 83, Canadian science fiction author,
Christopher Hipp, 47, American inventor (blade server) and entrepreneur, suspected embolism.
Dallas McKennon, 89, American actor and voice actor (Gumby, Buzz Buzzard, Archie Andrews), natural causes.
Kujtim Majaci, 47, Albanian footballer, heart attack.
Heinrich Schweiger, 77, Austrian actor, cardiovascular disease.
Muzaffer Tokaç, 86, Turkish footballer.
Jean Sommeng Vorachak, 76, Laotian Apostolic Vicar of Savannakhet.
Bill Young, 95, New Zealand politician and diplomat.
Zbigniew Zapasiewicz, 74, Polish actor and director.

15
Avraham Ahituv, 79, German-born Israeli intelligence chief, Director of the Shin Bet (1974–1980).
Khursheed Kamal Aziz, 81, Pakistani historian.
Seddon Bennington, 61, New Zealand chief executive of the Museum of New Zealand Te Papa Tongarewa, hypothermia.
Adama Drabo, 60/61, Malian filmmaker and playwright.
Natalya Estemirova, 50, Russian human rights activist in Chechnya and Ingushetia, shot.
Klára Fried-Bánfalvi, 78, Hungarian Olympic bronze medal-winning (1960) sprint canoeist.
Brian Goodwin, 78, Canadian mathematician, fall from a bicycle.
Julius Shulman, 98, American architectural photographer.

16
Thomas Dao, 88, Chinese-born American physician, expert in breast cancer treatment, Pick's Disease.
Leslie Fernandez, 91, British WW2 Special Forces saboteur and trainer of Violette Szabó.
Charles Gonthier, 80, Canadian jurist, Supreme Court Justice (1989–2003).
Maurice Grimaud, 95, French police chief of Paris during the 1968 student uprising.
Otto Heino, 94, American ceramicist and potter, acute renal failure.
Jerry Holland, 54, American-born Canadian fiddler and composer, cancer.
Paulo Lopes de Faria, 78, Brazilian archbishop of Diamantina. 
Bud Marshall, 67, American football player.
D. K. Pattammal, 90, Indian Carnatic singer, after short illness.
Angelo Rizzo, 83, Italian archbishop of Ragusa.
Ashraf W. Tabani, 79, Pakistani businessman and politician, Governor of Sindh (1987–1988).
Yury Verlinsky, 65, Russian medical researcher, colorectal cancer.

17

Meir Amit, 88, Israeli major general and politician.
Gordon Burn, 61, British writer, cancer.
Walter Cronkite, 92, American television news anchor, cerebrovascular disease.
Richard H. Hall, 78, American ufologist, colon cancer.
Leszek Kołakowski, 81, Polish philosopher, historian of ideas and essayist.
Jean Margéot, 93, Mauritian cardinal.
Gordon Waller, 64, British singer (Peter and Gordon), cardiac arrest.

18
Henry Allingham, 113, British supercentenarian, world's oldest man and World War I veteran.
Annagul Annakuliyeva, 85, Turkmen opera singer and actress.
Jill Balcon, 84, British actress, widow of Cecil Day-Lewis and mother of Daniel Day-Lewis, brain tumour.
Yasmine Belmadi, 33, French actor, traffic collision.
Lionel Casson, 94, American professor of Classics (New York University), author on ancient maritime history, pneumonia.
Ricardo Londoño, 59, Colombian racing driver, shot.
Denis Redman, 99, British army general.
Steven Rothenberg, 50, American studio executive (Lions Gate Entertainment, Artisan Entertainment), stomach cancer.
Graham Stanton, 69, New Zealand-born British theologian.
Robert Uffen, 85, Canadian geophysicist.
Joel Weisman, 66, American physician and pioneer in AIDS detection, heart disease.

19
Sue Burns, 58, American businesswoman, principal owner of the San Francisco Giants, lung cancer.
Alan Garnett Davenport, 76, Canadian engineer.
Karen Harup, 84, Danish swimmer, Olympic champion (1948).
Ingeborg Hunzinger, 94, German sculptor.
Frank McCourt, 78, Irish-American author (Angela's Ashes), melanoma.
Gilberto Mestrinho, 81, Brazilian Governor of Amazonas (1959–1963, 1983–1987, 1991–1995), lung cancer.
Cecil Mountford, 90, New Zealand rugby league player and coach.
Frank Rickwood, 88, Australian oil executive.
Guillermo Schulenburg, 93, Mexican Abbot of the Basilica of Our Lady of Guadalupe (1963–1996), natural causes.
Ray Shaw, 75, American journalist and work (American City Business Journals), complications from a wasp sting.
Bryan Stanley, 83, British trade unionist, General Secretary of the Post Office Engineering Union.
Henry Surtees, 18, British racing driver, Formula Two race accident.
Ebbe Wallén, 92, Swedish Olympic bobsledder.

20
Gene Amondson, 65, American politician, Prohibition Party nominee for U.S. President, stroke.
Gretel Bolliger, 87, Swiss Olympic athlete Gretel Bolliger
Ria Brieffies, 52, Dutch singer (Dolly Dots), lung cancer.
Edward T. Hall, 95, American anthropologist.
Bobby Knoxall, 75, British comedian.
Vedat Okyar, 64, Turkish journalist and footballer (Beşiktaş J.K.), colorectal cancer.
Stan Polley, 87, American music manager.
H. James Starr, 78, American politician.
Paul Fouad Tabet, 79, Lebanese archbishop, Nuncio to Greece (1996–2005).
Gösta Werner, 101, Swedish film director.
Carlton Willey, 78, American baseball player (Milwaukee Braves, New York Mets), lung cancer.

21
John Dawson, 64, American musician (New Riders of the Purple Sage), stomach cancer.
Armando del Moral, 93, Spanish-born American film journalist, natural causes.
Nelson Demarco, 84, Uruguayan basketball player, Olympic bronze medalist (1952, 1956).
Heinz Edelmann, 75, Czech-born German illustrator and designer, heart disease and renal failure.
Gidget, 15, American chihuahua, Taco Bell mascot, stroke.
Gangubai Hangal, 96, Indian Hindustani classical singer, cardiac arrest.
Marcel Jacob, 45, Swedish musician, suicide.
Yoshinori Kanada, 57, Japanese animator (My Neighbor Totoro, Princess Mononoke, Castle in the Sky), heart attack.
Les Lye, 84, Canadian actor and broadcaster (You Can't Do That on Television).
Hiroshi Wakasugi, 74, Japanese orchestra conductor, multiple organ dysfunction syndrome.

22
Howard Engle, 89, American pediatrician, lead plaintiff in landmark tobacco lawsuit, lymphoma.
Richard M. Givan, 88, American judge, Chief Justice of the Indiana Supreme Court (1969–1994).
Peter Krieg, 61, German documentary filmmaker.
Mark Leduc, 47, Canadian boxer, Olympic silver medalist (1992), heat stroke.
Herbert Morris, 94, American rower, Olympic gold medalist (1936).
Marco Antonio Nazareth, 23, Mexican boxer, cerebral hemorrhage.
Billy Parks, 61, American football player, melanoma.
Lynn Pressman Raymond, 97, American president of Pressman Toy Corporation.
John Ryan, 88, British cartoonist (Captain Pugwash).
Damian Steele, 33, American professional wrestler, brain aneurysm.
Aygyl Tajiyeva, 64, Turkmen politician and opposition activist, stroke.

23
Virginia Carroll, 95, American actress and model, natural causes.
E. Lynn Harris, 54, American author.
Conyers Herring, 94, American physicist.
Talis Kitsing, 33, Estonian reality TV star.
Danny McBride, 63, American singer-songwriter and guitarist (Sha Na Na), natural causes.
Duse Nacaratti, 67, Brazilian actress, respiratory failure.
Thomas N. Schroth, 88, American editor (Congressional Quarterly), founder of The National Journal, heart failure.

24
José Carlos da Costa Araújo, 47, Brazilian goalkeeper, reserve at 1990 World Cup, abdominal cancer.
Omar Dani, 85, Indonesian Commander of the National Air Force (1962–1965).
Friedrich Goldmann, 68, German composer and conductor.
Austin Gresham, 84, British pathologist.
G. Alexander Heard, 92, American presidential advisor, Chancellor of Vanderbilt University (1963–1982).
John Panton, 92, Scottish golfer.
Sir Edward Peck, 93, British diplomat, Permanent Representative to NATO (1970–1975).
Harry Towb, 83, British actor, cancer.

25
Yasmin Ahmad, 51, Malaysian film director, brain hemorrhage.
Rick Bryan, 47, American football player (Atlanta Falcons), heart attack.
Gladys Bustamante, 97, Jamaican trade unionist and activist, wife of Prime Minister Alexander Bustamante.
Alexis Cohen, 25, American singer, American Idol contestant, hit-and-run.
Vernon Forrest, 38, American former world welterweight and super welterweight (light middleweight) champion boxer, shot.
Gerald Gardner, 83, Irish-born American mathematician, evidence led to ban on sex-segregated classified advertising. leukemia.
Erling Kristiansen, 85, Norwegian Olympic cyclist.
Ken Major, 80, British architect.
Stanley Middleton, 89, British author, cancer.
Harry Patch, 111, British supercentenarian, fourth-last surviving World War I veteran.
Lorrie Pickering, 90, New Zealand politician.
Sarath Ranawaka, 58, Sri Lankan politician, after short illness.

26
John Brockway, 80, British swimmer.
Traugott Buhre, 80, German actor.
Bhaskar Chandavarkar, 73, Indian sitarist and composer, cancer.
Merce Cunningham, 90, American choreographer, natural causes.
Richard Ferguson, 73, British barrister, Queen's Counsel for Northern Ireland and former politician.
Clayton Hill, 78, American actor (Dawn of the Dead, Hellraiser III: Hell on Earth), complications from pneumonia.
Lois Hunt, 84, American lyric soprano, complications from cardiac surgery.
Marcey Jacobson, 97, American photographer of indigenous peoples in Mexico, heart failure.
James E. King, 69, American politician, Florida state senator since 1999, pancreatic cancer.
Maria Sílvia, 65, Brazilian actress, lung cancer.
Michael Steinberg, 80, American musicologist.
Sérgio Viotti, 82, Brazilian actor, cardiac arrest.
Jerry Yanover, 62, Canadian political advisor.

27
Bernadette Cozart, 60, American gardener, urban gardening advocate, heart attack.
Dick Holub, 87, American basketball player (NY Knicks) and coach (FDU).
Lars Käll, 75, Swedish Olympic sailor.
Domingos Lam, 81, Chinese Roman Catholic bishop of Macau.
Joseph C. Muren, 73, American Mormon general authority.
Lee Orr, 92, Canadian Olympic athlete.
Luis Quintana, 57, Puerto Rican baseball player (California Angels), natural causes.
George Russell, 86, American jazz composer, complications from Alzheimer's disease.
Larry Siemering, 98, American college football head coach, complications from a fall.
Sybil, 3, British Downing Street cat, Chief Mouser to the Cabinet Office (2007–2008), after short illness.
Aeronwy Thomas, 66, British translator and writer, daughter of Dylan Thomas, cancer.
Michaël Zeeman, 50, Dutch literary critic, journalist, poet and writer, brain cancer.

28
Stelios Georgousopoulos, 43, Greek Olympian windsurfer, illness.
Hermann J. Huber, 54, German journalist and writer, heart attack.
Reverend Ike, 74, American evangelist, stroke.
Jim Johnson, 68, American football coach (Philadelphia Eagles), melanoma.
Kaori Kawamura, 38, Japanese singer, breast cancer.
Brian Mears, 78, British Chairman of Chelsea Football Club (1969–1991).
Leela Naidu, 69, Indian actress, Miss India (1954), after long illness.
Bernard Rosenthal, 94, American sculptor, stroke.
William G. Tapply, 69, American writer, leukemia,
Peter Tahourdin, 80, British-born Australian composer.

29
Remi Abiola, 55, Nigerian actress, cancer.
Dina Babbitt, 86, Czech-born American artist and Holocaust survivor, abdominal cancer.
Rajan P. Dev, 58, Indian actor, after short illness.
Gayatri Devi, 90, Indian royal, last Maharani of Jaipur (1939–1970), paralytic ileus.
Steve Fiorilla, 48, American artist.
Joanne Jordan, 88, American actress and spokesmodel, Parkinson's disease.
Ernest W. Lefever, 90, American foreign policy expert, founder of Ethics and Public Policy Center, dementia with Lewy bodies.
Paul McGrillen, 37, Scottish footballer (Motherwell F.C.).
Olga A. Méndez, 84, American politician, New York State Senator (1978–2004), breast cancer.
Steven Miessner, 48, American Academy Awards administrator, heart attack.
Hideaki Motoyama, 40, Japanese Olympic badminton player.
Renato Pagliari, 69, Italian-born British singer (Renée and Renato), brain cancer.
Edward Richardson, 79, Australian cricketer.
*Zhuo Lin, 93, Chinese consultant, widow of Deng Xiaoping.

30
Zahirul Islam Abbasi, 66, Pakistani general.
Kola Abdulai, 62, Nigerian Olympic sprinter.
Renato Izzo, 80, Italian actor, voice actor and screenwriter.
Yuri Kurnenin, 55, Belarusian football player and coach.
Joy Langan, 66, Canadian politician, MP for Mission—Coquitlam (1988–1993), breast cancer.
Yoshihisa Maitani, 76, Japanese camera designer.
Mohammed Yusuf, 39, Nigerian sect leader (emileah soto), shot.
Peter Zadek, 83, German stage director, film director and screenwriter, illness.

31
Sir Edward Archdale, 87, British Royal Navy officer.
John Donnelly, 82, Scottish footballer (Celtic, Preston North End).
Tim Guest, 34, British writer, suspected heart attack.
David Hawkes, 86, British sinologist.
Chris Humphries, 62, British botanist.
Ted Nierenberg, 86, American entrepreneur, founder of Dansk International Designs, pancreatic cancer.
Sir Bobby Robson, 76, British footballer and manager, lung cancer.
Jean-Paul Roussillon, 78, French actor.
Harry Alan Towers, 88, British film producer and screenwriter, after short illness.

References

2009-07
 07